Matías David Maidana (born 9 March 1987) is an Argentine footballer who is last known to have played as a defender for River Plate (Asunción).

Career

In 2007, Maidana joined the youth academy of Boca, Argentina's most successful clubs, after playing for Los Andes in the Argentine third division.

Before the 2011 season, he signed for Brazilian side Linense after playing for Deportivo Armenio in the Argentine third division.

Before the 2013 season, he signed for Argentine fourth division team Berazategui.

Before the 2020 season, Maidana signed for River Plate (Asunción) in the Paraguayan top flight after playing for Argentine fourth division outfit Cañuelas, where he made 9 league appearances and scored 0 goals.

He is the brother of footballer Jonatan Maidana.

References

External links
 
 

Argentine footballers
Expatriate footballers in Paraguay
Living people
Argentine expatriate footballers
1987 births
People from Adrogué
Association football defenders
Paraguayan Primera División players
Club Atlético Los Andes footballers
River Plate (Asunción) footballers
Primera Nacional players
Deportivo Armenio footballers
Cañuelas footballers
CSyD Tristán Suárez footballers
Argentine expatriates in Paraguay
Sportspeople from Buenos Aires Province